The 2002–03 Women's National Cricket League season was the seventh season of the Women's National Cricket League, the women's domestic limited overs cricket competition in Australia. The tournament started on 9 November 2002 and finished on 18 January 2003. Victorian Spirit won the tournament for the first time after topping the ladder at the conclusion of the group stage and beating New South Wales Breakers by two games to zero in the finals series, ending the Breakers' six-tournament winning streak.

Ladder

Fixtures

1st final

2nd final

References

 
Women's National Cricket League seasons
 
Women's National Cricket League